The GER Class C32 was a class of fifty  steam locomotives designed by James Holden and built by the company's Stratford Works between 1892 and 1902. They all passed to the London and North Eastern Railway at the 1923 grouping and received the classification F3.

History
These locomotives were fitted with  cylinders and  diameter driving wheels. They were a tank engine version of the T26 class s, albeit with a  shorter coupled wheelbase. They shared the same type of boiler as that class, as well as the N31 and later Y14 class s. They were intended for use on long-distance stopping services, and so they were all initially fitted with Westinghouse air brake equipment.

The R33 and D53 batches had been fitted with condensing equipment from new, but the LNER gradually removed them from all but one locomotive, the exception being an early retirement.

All had survived to pass to the LNER in 1923; the first retirement started in 1936 when 8090 was withdrawn.

Thirty-seven locomotives lasted long enough to be renumbered in the 1946 scheme; fifteen of them became the property of British Railways in 1948, but only three of them lasted long enough to receive their BR number.

References

Sources

Further material

C32
2-4-2T locomotives
Railway locomotives introduced in 1893
Scrapped locomotives
Standard gauge steam locomotives of Great Britain
Condensing steam locomotives
Passenger locomotives